Craig Krampf (born October 22, 1954) is an American drummer, percussionist, arranger, record producer and songwriter.

The majority of his notable credits are as a studio drummer. Since the 1970s, he has played on albums by other artists ranging from Steve Perry to Alabama to Kim Carnes to Flo & Eddie to Alice Cooper to Melissa Etheridge. Additionally, Krampf and Perry were founding members of the short-lived rock group Alien Project.

As a songwriter, his biggest hit was with Steve Perry's "Oh Sherrie" (co-written with Perry, Randy Goodrum, and Bill Cuomo), which peaked at #3 on the Billboard Hot 100 chart. Besides "Oh Sherrie," Krampf co-wrote three other songs on Perry's Street Talk album, including "Strung Out", which made it to #40 on the Billboard Hot 100. He also co-wrote a song with Kim Carnes and Duane Hitchings—"I'll Be Here Where the Heart Is"—on the Grammy Award-winning Flashdance (1983) soundtrack.

As a producer, his most notable credit is for producing Ashley Cleveland's "Big Town" (1991, Atlantic Records), Krampf also produced Disappear Fear's self-titled studio album (1994, Rounder Records).

Partial résumé
Kim Carnes – "Bette Davis Eyes", "Crazy in the Night (Barking at Airplanes)", Romance Dance, Mistaken Identity, Voyeur, Café Racers, Barking at Airplanes, Light House, View from the House
Alice Cooper – Special Forces, Zipper Catches Skin
Paul Stanley – Paul Stanley
Lita Ford – Lita
Cher – "Skin Deep"
Richard Simmons – Reach
Jane Wiedlin – Jane Wiedlin
Randy Meisner – One More Song
Timothy B. Schmit – Playin' It Cool
Joan Armatrading – "Drop the Pilot"
Steve Perry – Street Talk
The Motels – "Only the Lonely"
Melissa Etheridge – "Bring Me Some Water"
Pam Tillis – Above and Beyond the Doll of Cutey
Patty Loveless – "You Can Feel Bad"
Tanya Tucker – "Can't Run from Yourself"
Nick Gilder – "City Nights"
Silver Condor (feat. Joe Cerisano) – "Trouble At Home"

References

External links
 
 
 

American rock drummers
Alice Cooper (band) members
Grammy Award winners
Living people
Place of birth missing (living people)
1954 births